Fusional vergence is the movement of both eyes that enables the fusion of monocular images producing binocular vision. It is especially important when a person has heterophoria. Premotor cells for fusional vergence are located in the mesencephalon near the oculomotor nucleus.

References

Eye